"Facts of Love" is a song by Jeff Lorber with Karyn White on lead vocals. It was released as a single in 1986 from their album Private Passion. The song peaked at number 27 on the US Billboard Hot 100, becoming Lorber's only Top 40 hit.

Chart performance

See also
 List of one-hit wonders in the United States

References

1986 singles
1986 songs
Warner Records singles
Songs written by Carl Sturken and Evan Rogers